No Problem may refer to:

No problem, an English-language expression
The "No-Problem" Problem, in spoken usage as a facet of systemic bias

Film and television
 No Problem! (TV series), a 1983–1985 British sitcom
 No Problem (1992 film), a Canadian animated short film
 No Problem (2000 film), a Marathi film of 2000
 No Problem (2010 film), a Bollywood film

Music

Albums
 No Problem (Al Cohn album), 1980
 No Problem (Chet Baker album), 1980
 No Problem (Fann Wong album), 2000
 No Problem (Sonny Rollins album), 1981
 No Problem, by MFÖ, 1987

Songs
 "No Problem" (Chance the Rapper song), 2016
 "No Problem" (Lil Scrappy song), 2004
 "No Problems", by Azealia Banks, 2013
 "No Problem", by deadmau5 from W:/2016ALBUM/, 2016
 "No Problem", by Pusha T from the film Venom, 2018
 "No Problems", by DJ Kay Slay from The Streetsweeper, Vol. 2, 2004
 "No Problems", by Fat Joe from The Dark Side, 2010
 "No Problems", by NOFX from Maximum Rocknroll, 1989
 "No Problems", by Status Quo from Rock 'til You Drop, 1991
 "Jambo - Hakuna Matata (No Problems)", by Boney M. from Kalimba de Luna – 16 Happy Songs, 1984
 "Si-Joya" ("No Problem"), by Duke Jordan from Flight to Jordan, 1960